The qualifying for the 2014 Men's World Floorball Championships took part in early 2014. A total of 30 teams competed for fifteen spots. The final tournament was organized by Sweden in December 2014.

Overview
Numbers in brackets show the ranking before the qualification started, which was based on results from the last two World Championships.

Europe
The qualification rules were as follows:
 The two best teams from each qualification group qualified
 The two best third placed teams qualified
 The calculation of the best 3rd teams followed this order:
 1. Average number of points 
 2. Average goal difference 
 3. Average scored goals
 4. Drawing of lots

European Qualification 1
Dates: 29 January – 2 February 2014
Venue: Łochów Arena, Łochów, Poland

European Qualification 2
Dates: 29 January – 2 February 2014
Venue: HANT Aréna, Bratislava, Slovakia

European Qualification 3
Dates: 28 January – 1 February 2014
Venue: Jan Massinkhal, Nijmegen, Netherlands

European Qualification 4
Dates: 28 January – 1 February 2014
Venue: Vidzemes OC, Valmiera, Latvia

Ranking of third-placed teams
Since the number of teams between the qualification groups differ, the group sizes were equalised by removing the results from the matches against the lowest placed teams in the larger-sized group before comparing the average results.

Asia–Oceania
The three best teams from the qualification group qualified

Dates: 29 January – 1 February 2014
Venue: ASB Sports Centre,  Wellington, New Zealand

Americas
The qualification rules are as follows:
 The two best teams from the qualification group will qualify

Dates: 31 January – 2 February 2014
Venue: Cornell Community Centre, Markham, Canada

References

2014, Men's Qualifying
Men's World Floorball Championships qualifying
Men's World Floorball Championships qualifying
Men's World Floorball Championships qualifying
Men's World Floorball Championships qualifying
Men's World Floorball Championships qualifying
Men's World Floorball Championships qualifying
2014 in floorball